The former Grand Trunk station of Yarmouth, Maine, is located on the east side of the railroad tracks, just south of Maine State Route 115, the town's Main Street.  The railroad station was built in 1906 by the Grand Trunk Railroad, and is a well-preserved example of an early 20th-century passenger rail depot, an increasingly rare sight in the state.  The building, which is now in commercial use, was added to the National Register of Historic Places on July 10, 1979.

Description and history
Yarmouth's former Grand Trunk station stands just south of SR 115, on the east side of the Maine Central Railroad tracks. (The Amtrak Downeaster service between Portland and Brunswick runs on the Boston and Maine Railroad line, which crosses this track just to the north.  It does not stop in Yarmouth.)  The station is a single-story wood-frame structure, set on a high granite block foundation.  It has a hip roof and clapboard siding, and is roughly rectangular in shape, with small projecting sections on the either side, and a semicircular northern end.   The roof has extended eaves, in a form typical of many railroad stations, with the eaves supported by large decoratively-cut brackets.

The station was built in 1906 by the Grand Trunk Railway as a passenger depot on its line between Portland and Montreal. (There were three lines in total at the time of the station's construction.) It is architecturally unique in Maine, particularly for its high granite base, apsoidal curved end, and departure from more traditional Stick style architecture. The Yarmouth Village Improvement Society purchased the station from the Grand Trunk's successor Canadian National Railway for $500 in 1968 to save it from demolition. It housed a florist until February 2018, when it was put on the market for $165,000. It is now occupied by a branch of Gorham Savings Bank.

See also 
 Grand Trunk railway stations, other stations of the Grand Trunk Railroad and its subsidiaries
 National Register of Historic Places listings in Cumberland County, Maine
 Historical buildings and structures of Yarmouth, Maine

References

Railway stations on the National Register of Historic Places in Maine
Railway stations in the United States opened in 1906
Transportation buildings and structures in Cumberland County, Maine
Commercial buildings in Yarmouth, Maine
Yarmouth, Maine
National Register of Historic Places in Cumberland County, Maine
Former railway stations in Maine